Yan Yevgenyevich Ishchenko (born 10 March 1980) is a former Russian professional football player.

Club career
He played three seasons in the Russian Football National League for FC Kristall Smolensk, FC SKA Rostov-on-Don and FC Dynamo Bryansk.

References

External links
 

1980 births
People from Krasnodar Krai
Living people
Russian footballers
Association football forwards
FC Zhemchuzhina Sochi players
FC Kristall Smolensk players
FC Volgar Astrakhan players
FC Spartak-UGP Anapa players
FC Rotor Volgograd players
FC Metallurg Lipetsk players
FC SKA Rostov-on-Don players
FC Dynamo Bryansk players
FC Mashuk-KMV Pyatigorsk players
Sportspeople from Krasnodar Krai